Banyen Rakkaen (born on October 14, 1952 to an Isan family in Ubon Ratchathani province in the Isan region of Northeast Thailand) is a Thai mor lam and Thai luk thung singer. Banyen Rakkaen is known as the "Queen of mor lam" and after 45 years in the business she was named a National Artist in 2014 for her contribution to folk music.

Biography 
She is also a student of National Artist, Master Chaweewan Dumnern.

Banyen was the first national mor lam star, whose appearances on television in the 1980s brought the form to an audience beyond its northeastern heartland.
She bridges the gap between traditional and modern mor lam, normally appearing in traditional clothing but using electrified instruments and singing luk thung and dance-influenced songs.

References

Banyen Rakgan
Living people
1952 births
Banyen Rakgan
Banyen Rakgan
Banyen Rakgan
Banyen Rakgan